Évry Cathedral ("Évry Cathedral of the Resurrection") is a Roman Catholic church located in the new town of Évry (Essonne), France. The cathedral was designed by Swiss architect Mario Botta. It opened in 1995 and was consecrated and dedicated to Saint Corbinian in 1996. It is the only cathedral begun and completed in France in the 20th century.

History
Évry is located in the suburbs of Paris, in the new town of Corbeil-Essonnes, which has a large majority immigrant population.   The diocese was created in 1966, and the parish church of Saint-Spire was elevated to the status of the bishop's seat as Corbeil Cathedral, but neither it nor any other existing church was suitable in size and location, and the bishop's offices were in a converted primary school. Évry was the natural centre of the area and population of the new diocese and was accordingly chosen as the episcopal centre, but lacked a suitable significant structure.

In 1988, the diocese was renamed the Diocese of Évry–Corbeil-Essonnes and Évry Cathedral was commissioned from the Swiss architect Mario Botta, then forty-one years old. Botta was particularly known for his reconstruction of the church of St. John the Baptist in Mogno in Switzerland, after the former church was destroyed by an avalanche.  The new church in Mogno, in the form of truncated cylinder, was finished in 1986.  

Initial studies for the cathedral began in 1988. Fundraising began in 1989. The new Cathedral was funded by contributions from more than 200,000 donors.  Other major contributors included a national fund created between the two World Wars for the reconstruction of religious structures destroyed in the Paris region, a major contribution from the Diocese of Munich, Germany, and public agencies in the Île-de-France region.

Initial studies were carried out the same year, and the first stone was laid at Easter of  1991. Construction began in 1992 and was completed in 1995.  The first mass was held in that year. The cathedral was formally consecrated on May 2, 1996.  The Cathedral was visited by Pope John-Paul II on August 22, 1997.

Exterior

Form 
The cathedral is in the form of a truncated cylinder, with an inclined roof. The line of the roof is broken by trees, which gives a variation of color with the changing seasons.  Describing his choice of the cylinder form, Botta wrote, "I find in the primary forms a clarity and a call to order amid disorder, whether it concerns a church, a mansion or a house." The truncated cylinder had appeared in one his first buildings, the Church of San Giovanni Batista in Mogno, Switzerland (1986–1996) and later appeared in the San Francisco Museum of Modern Art. (1990–1995)

Material 
The cathedral exterior gives the impression of being constructed entirely of brick, but actually is composed of two cylinders of reinforced concrete covered with bricks of the classic construction size.

The brick of the exterior is designed as a series of horizontal bands, broken by a small number windows. The bricks are laid in designs that give it a delicate, lace-like quality. 

Botta explained that he selected brick for its aesthetic qualities, and because "I try to utilise the most basic, humble materials, but with the desire to give them a certain dignity."

Northwest side – bell tower  
The highest point of the cylinder faces to the northwest, and presents a series of geometric forms and symbols from the bottom to the top. At the bottom is a hemispherical window with a design that represents a stylised tree of life. Above this are the windows of the National Center for Sacred Art.  separated by a vertical rectangular column that contains a stairway.  Above this is an oculus window, in the form of a rosace, and above it, attached to the facade, is the metallic bell tower, containing five bells. The bell tower supports the cross above.

Southeast side – main entrance 
The principal entrance to the cathedral is on the southwest side, behind a v-shaped terrace. The voussures over the entry porch suggest the portal of a Gothic cathedral, but in this case, the voussures are pure rectangles without sculpture, designed to highlight the contrast between darkness and light. Over the entrance are rows of small vertical windows that resemble the meurtriers, or narrow defensive slits, adding to the appearance of a medieval castle.

Interior 

Within the interior of the church, the altar and the choir is located to the northwest, facing the main portal to the southeast.

Nave 

The semicircular nave, the portion of the church where the congregation is seated, resembles a theater, with rows of seats on main floor and additional seating in two levels of galleries. It can seat between eight hundred and one thousand worshippers. The organ is placed into a niche in the brick, near a balcony that holds the members of the choir.

The wooden pews or seats were designed by Botta and made from light-coloured oak from Burgundy.  Their design is very simple and geometric, and the straight rows provide a contrast with the curving walls of the  nave.

Choir 

The choir is traditionally the part of the cathedral reserved for the clergy, separating the nave and apse. At Évry it separated from the nave by six steps up to a platform where the altar is located. Behind the altar is a dramatic curving arch with a modern stained glass window in light and dark glass, representing the Tree of Life. This was not part of the original design of the cathedral but was requested by the Bishop as a means of representing the divinity of light.

 The altar is made of a single block of Carrera marble.  Above the altar and window is 19th-century statue of Christ on the cross, carved of light-coloured wood from Tanzania.

 On the wall over the pulpit is a modern bronze statue of Saint Corbinien on the Cross, patron saint of the Cathedral, made by the French sculptors Hugues and France Siptrott.

 The Baptismal font is located to the left of the altar platform, viewed from the nave. It is circular and large enough for baptisms by immersion and made of white Carrara marble set against the black granite of the floor. Its placement corresponds with the doctrine of the Vatican II Council, which declared that baptism was an event to be shared with the whole church community.  

 The pulpit is made of light-coloured wood from Burgundy, and is normally to the right of the choir viewed from the nave, but can be placed as needed for a ceremony. 

 The tabernacle in the choir, near the pulpit, pulpit contains the consecrated hosts used during the communion ceremony. It is a cube designed by the French artist Louis Cane, with three sides decorated with Biblical symbols inspired by those of the early Christians.     

The rectangular Bishop's seat or throne (literally the "Cathedra") is made of the same light-coloured oak as the pews. It is flanked by two smaller seats for the assessors. The position of the seat is given visible prominence by the design on the brick wall behind it, and by the hemispherical section of black stone floor where it is placed.

Gallery-Disambulatory
The Gallery-Disambulatory is a wide curving stairway that gradually descends from the southeast entrance along the church wall down to the intersection between the choir and the nave. On the way, it passes by a series of wide horizontal openings containing a series of twelve narrow vertical bays with stained glass windows made by Father Kim En Joong, a Dominican priest of Korean origin. 

The lower portion of the gallery is decorated with works of art, including three large plaques created with petrified wood from Arizona, made by the artist Jean-Christophe Guillon, which depict the arrest, death and resurrection of Christ, and two bronze arcs representing the crown of thorns, engraved with the numbers of the stations of the cross.

Ceiling and skylights

In the center of the sloping circular roof is a three-dimensional triangle of metal tubing, containing windows and movable glass panels, making it possible to control the level of incoming light. When the panels are open, the congregation below can also see the circle of trees around the roof. Botta described his nave as "a primary space held between the earth and the sky, a place for meditation, for silence."

Chapel of the Holy Sacrament 
The Chapel of the Holy Sacrament, also called the Day Chapel, is the only chapel within the Cathedral. It is in an octagonal form, borrowed from early Christian churches such as the Basilica of San Vitale in Ravenna.  The number eight is considered a symbol of harmony.  The roof has a caisson or rectangular grid form, similar to those of Romanesque cathedrals and some Italian churches, such as the Pisa Cathedral.

The floor of the chapel has alternating rows of polished stone and jaw stone, an updated and stylised version of the labyrinth of Chartres Cathedral. 
The sculptural elements of the chapel include a modernised Virgin and Child statue, a stylised crucifix and a tabernacle made of forged iron and gilded bronze, all by the French artist Gerard Garouste.

Setting 
Rather than standing apart from the other buildings around it, the cathedral is closely integrated with them. It stands just ten meters from the city hall and is directly connected with a residential and commercial building that contains one hundred housing units offices and shops, that form an informal "cloister" of the cathedral. The cathedral is also covered with the same color brick as the surrounding buildings. Botta planned the heights of the cathedral  cylinder ( to ) to be proportional with the height of the adjacent buildings, to ).  He added an additional contrast between the small number of windows on the cathedral cylinder and the large and multiple windows of the adjoining buildings.

The bells 
The cathedral has five bells, which were made at the Paccard Foundry in Annecy. The three largest bells are in the horizontal portion of the campanile, while the smaller bells are in the vertical portion.  The largest bell, weighing 640 kilos, is named "Mario Maria Giuditta Tobia Tomaso", the names of the family of the architect.  The others are named for donors, and one, François-Michel, for a young priest of the diocese who died in 1984. The bells were rung for the first time in October 1994. 

They can be heard by clicking on the link at right.

Inspiration 

Botta wrote, "I was inspired by the great eastern and  Byzantine tradition of Christian architecture, with its circular plan or Greek cross, but without a central altar, and by the western tradition with its use of a Greek cross. I tried to mix these two typologies."   He cited the Basilica of San Vitale in Ravenna (6th century), and the Byzantine architecture and Romanesque architecture of northern Italy, which he studied as a student in Venice. He said it offered a sense of sobriety, solidity, an appreciation for primary forms, and a sensibility to the effects of light on the exterior.  

He was also inspired by more recent works, including Notre-Dame-du-Haut at Ronchamp by Le Corbusier (1955). He had met and briefly collaborated with Corbusier in 1965 on a hospital project, not realised.

Botta and the truncated cylinder  

The truncated cylinder became a motif associated with Mario Botta, both before and after Evry Cathedral. He used it previously in a simple form at the Church of Mogno (1986–1996), and used it later in a more complex setting, in the San Francisco Museum of Modern Art (1989–1995)

Statistics
Height:  to 
Interior diameter: 
Exterior diameter: 
 Volume: 45,000 cubic meters (1,589,160 cubic feet)
 Capacity: 1500 places, including 800 seated
 Cost: 10.7 million Euros

Chronology
 1988 – first plans and studies
 1989 – laying of first stone
 1992 – construction begins
 1995 – completion of work, first mass
 1996 – official inauguration (May 2)
 1997 – visited by Pope John-Paul II (August 22) 
 As the seat of the diocese, it has now superseded Corbeil Cathedral.

Notes and citations

References
 Debruyères, F.  Ville nouvelle d'Evry (Essonne), in "Travaux", March 1992, n. 674.

External links 
  Évry Cathedral website of the Diocese of Évry-Corbeil-Essonnes
évry : une cathédrale pour le XXe siècle - Chantiers du Cardinal
  Évry Cathedral website of the Diocese of Évry-Corbeil-Essonnes
 

Churches in Essonne
Roman Catholic cathedrals in France
Buildings and structures in Évry, Essonne
Roman Catholic churches completed in 1995
1995 establishments in France
Mario Botta buildings
Brick buildings and structures
Modernist architecture in France
20th-century Roman Catholic church buildings in France